Roy Robert Mitchell (born 1 January 1955) is a male British former long jumper, born in Jamaica.

Athletics career
Mitchell competed in the 1976 Summer Olympics. He represented England and won a gold medal in the long jump event, at the 1978 Commonwealth Games in Edmonton, Alberta, Canada.

References

1955 births
Living people
Jamaican emigrants to the United Kingdom
English male long jumpers
Olympic athletes of Great Britain
Athletes (track and field) at the 1976 Summer Olympics
Commonwealth Games medallists in athletics
Commonwealth Games gold medallists for England
Athletes (track and field) at the 1978 Commonwealth Games
Medallists at the 1978 Commonwealth Games